Mario Kröpfl (born 29 September 1991) is an Austrian footballer. He most recently played for SV Ried.

References

1991 births
Living people
Association football defenders
Austrian footballers
First Vienna FC players
Floridsdorfer AC players
SV Ried players
Austrian Regionalliga players
2. Liga (Austria) players